Burnin' Up the Road is the debut studio album by American country music band McBride & the Ride. Released in 1990 on MCA Records, it was produced by Tony Brown and Steve Fishell. The lead-off single, "Felicia", peaked at No. 74 on the RPM country charts in Canada but did not chart in the US. Following this song was "Every Step of the Way" which failed to chart. The third and fourth singles, "Can I Count on You" and "Same Ol' Star", peaked at No. 15 and No. 28 respectively on the Billboard country charts in the US. "Every Step of the Way" was also made into the band's first music video.

The title track was later recorded by John Anderson on the soundtrack to the 1994 film 8 Seconds.

Track listing
All songs composed by Bill Carter, Ruth Ellsworth, and Terry McBride except where noted.
"Ain't No Big Deal" – 2:49
"Felicia" – 3:12
"Same Old Star" (Carter, Ellsworth, McBride, Gary Nicholson) – 3:34
"Every Step of the Way" – 3:07
"Chains of Memory" – 3:33
"Stone Country" (Robert Byrne, Tom Brasfield) – 3:40
"Can I Count On You" – 3:18
"Burnin' Up the Road" – 3:31
"Nobody's Fool" – 4:01
"Turn to Blue" (Rosie Flores, McBride) – 2:59

Charts

Weekly charts

Year-end charts

References

1990 debut albums
MCA Records albums
McBride & the Ride albums
Albums produced by Tony Brown (record producer)